The Solide expedition was the second successful circumnavigation by the French, after that by Bougainville. It occurred from 1790 to 1792 but remains little known due to its mainly commercial aims, in the fur trade between the northwest American coast and China.  It was led by the French navigator Étienne Marchand (1755–1793).

See also
 European and American voyages of scientific exploration

Notes and references

External links
http://www.britishcolumbia.com/regions/towns/?townID=3661

Marquesas Islands
1790 in France
1790 in science